Phryganodes flocculentalis is a moth in the family Crambidae. It was described by George Hampson in 1899. It is found in Himachal Pradesh in India and Pulo Laut in Indonesia.

References

Spilomelinae
Moths described in 1899